"What Do You Say to That" is a song written by Jim Lauderdale and Melba Montgomery.  It was recorded by Lauderdale on his 1997 album, Whisper.  In 1999, it was recorded by both David Ball on his album Play, and by George Strait on his album Always Never the Same.  Strait's version was released in July 1999 as the third and final single from this album.  It peaked at number 4 in the United States, and number 2 in Canada.

Critical reception
Larry Flick, of Billboard magazine reviewed the song favorably, calling it a "lovely little tune with a pretty melody and a positive lyric." He goes on to say that the production incorporates "sweet, understated fiddle and piano that interplay nicely with Strait's eloquent vocal performance."

Chart positions
"What Do You Say to That" re-entered the U.S. Billboard Hot Country Singles & Tracks chart at number 67 as an official single for the week of July 31, 1999.

Year-end charts

References

1999 singles
David Ball (country singer) songs
George Strait songs
Songs written by Jim Lauderdale
Songs written by Melba Montgomery
Song recordings produced by Tony Brown (record producer)
MCA Nashville Records singles
1997 songs